The 1956 United States Senate election in Oregon was held on November 7, 1956 to select the U.S. Senator from the state of Oregon.  Republican-turned-Independent-turned Democratic Senator Wayne Morse decided to seek re-election for his first full term as a Democrat. Morse defeated Republican candidate Douglas McKay in the hotly contested general election.

Candidates

Democratic
Wayne Morse – incumbent Senator since 1945; member of the Democratic party since 1955.

Republican
Douglas McKay – former Governor of Oregon (1949–1952) and United States Secretary of the Interior (1953–1956)

Results

See also 
 1956 United States Senate elections

References

Oregon
1956
Senate